Waldorf Music is a German synthesizer company. They are best known for the Microwave wavetable synthesizer and Blofeld virtual analogue synthesizer.

History 
Waldorf Electronics GmbH was founded in 1988 by Wolfgang Düren, who at the time was the German distributor of PPG. The Waldorf name refers to the German town Waldorf (near to the former capital of West Germany: Bonn) where the company was founded. Later, the company was headquartered in Schloss Ahrenthal.
On 5 February 2004, Waldorf declared insolvency at a German court. Shortly before, the company was turned into an Aktiengesellschaft called Waldorf Music AG, but to no avail. 
In Summer 2006, a new company Waldorf Music GmbH was officially established, although it is not a legal successor to the original company. Waldorf's headquarter has now moved to Remagen and is led by CEO Joachim Flor.

After the demise of PPG in 1987, Waldorf took over the heritage of wavetable synthesis. Based on an ASIC designed by Wolfgang Palm, the Microwave, and later the WAVE, were built. However, Palm never functioned as an employee of Waldorf. 
Over the years, Waldorf continuously adapted new technologies. While the Microwave I (released 1989) was based on ASICs and a Motorola MC68000 micro processor, Microwave II (1997) was driven by a DSP. In 2013, NAVE, a synthesizer app for iOS was released. Their Kyra (2019) is the first fully FPGA-powered synthesizer.

While many other synth manufacturers aimed to recreate previously existing hardware in software, Waldorf went the other way and presented the RackAttack, a hardware drum synth in 2002. The synth engine had been published as a VST instrument a year before. Nevertheless, the Streichfett came up in 2014: a synth that recreated the sound of vintage string machines.

Products

1989 

 Microwave. Rack wavetable synth and developed from the PPG Wave. Built in two different hardware revisions: the first ones had a backlit LCD. The later ones a lit character display. They use a different Curtis CEM analog lowpass filter chips. Later called Microwave I due to the 1997 introduced Microwave II

1990 
 Midibay MB-15. Rack MIDI patchbay and merger

1991 
 Microwave Waveslave. 1 HE voice extension for the original Microwave (adding another 8 voices)

1993 
 WAVE. A wavetable synthesizer. This was a deluxe extrapolation of Microwave technology, with additional features for wavetable creation and resynthesis that even today is not available on any other synthesizer. Available in 4 colours. 61 or 76 keys. 16, 32, or 48 voices and expandable to 120. Retail price in 1994 was $9000.00 with less than 200 made. The WAVE was used by for example Depeche Mode, Hans Zimmer and The Orb.
 4-pole. Table top analog filter box.
 EQ-27. Compact (table top) programmable and MIDI controllable stereo 7 band equalizer.

1994 

 Microwave I V2.0 ROM upgrade, which added additional wavetables, a facility to algorithmically create custom wavetables, a speech synthesizer, and numerous other improvements. The Waveslave was not compatible with this upgrade, but a trade-in program was offered where the user could upgrade to a full Microwave for a small fee.
 A limited edition Mean Green Machine was released at the same time as this upgrade, being a Microwave with a new "Nextel" rubberized finish in a green color, a certificate of authenticity, special cone-shaped metal feet, and comical silkscreening (the power switch was labeled Life, and the card slot was labeled Food.) Normal Microwave units from then on featured the Nextel finish in the usual blue color.

1995 

 Gekko Chords and Gekko Trigger: Very compact passive powered MIDI tools
 Hohner Adam
 Pulse: Monophonic analog rack synth

1997 
 Gekko Arpeggiator. Very compact passive powered Midi tool
 Microwave II. Motorola DSP driven wavetable rack synth, containing many features of the original Microwave with improved mixing, modulation, effects processing, and multimode filter.
 Pulse+. Monophonic analog rack synth with additional audio in and MIDI / CV/gate interface

1998 
 x-pole. Programmable stereo (in/out) analog filter in a 2HE rack module. With full MIDI, CV/Gate and ACM support.
 Microwave XT. Microwave II with 44 knobs and audio input, in 5HE package with bright orange color.
 Microwave XT Limited Edition. Microwave XT in charcoal gray/black color scheme, in a limited edition run of 666 units.
 d-pole. VST filter plug-in
 Terratec Microwave PC. Synth module for the TerraTec EWS sound cards, featuring a fully functional Microwave II in a drivebay package.
 Wavetable Oscillator for Creamware Modular

1999 
 Q. DSP driven virtual analog synth. 58 knobs! Colours: bright yellow "sahara" and WAVE blue, the latter became popularly known as the Halloween edition.
 XTk. The Microwave XT with a 49 key keyboard
 Q rack. Rack version of the Q synth. Fewer knobs. Yellow and dark blue.

2000 

 PPG 2.V VST plug-in synthesizer to emulate the blue PPG. wave 2.x wavetable synthesizers
 microQ. Even more compact and affordable Q rack with only 7 knobs and different DSP. Differences: 25 potential voices compared to the original models, due to shared operation and effects chip. A 75 voice expansion is available. The upgrade must be done by Waldorf or licensed repair center. Typical usage depended upon complexity of patches, unlike the Q or Q Rack which feature 16 note polyphony, upgradable to 32 voices. The microQ did not include the step sequencer.

2001 
 Attack. VST drum-synth plug-in
 Color of the Q, Q rack & mQ changed to the classic (Microwave) blue
 microQ keyboard. 3 octave keyboard version of the mQ. Classic blue coloured

2002 

 D-coder. A synth and vocoder Plug-In for the TC Powercore hardware platform
 RackAttack. The VST in a microQ housing
 Q+ A red Q featuring up to 100 dynamically allocated voices and 16 analog lowpass filters
 A1 VSTi software synth for Steinberg Cubase SX and Nuendo
 Waldorf Filter for Halion

2003 
 AFB-16. 16 analog filters to be used via USB for VST instrument and effects.

2004 
 On 5 February Waldorf Music AG declared insolvency at a German court.

2006 
 In April 2006 Waldorf Music GmbH formed. Even though during August of that same year the website experienced intermittent availability resulting in multiple pronouncements of its demise, in November the Waldorf user mailing list/forum was resurrected.

2007 

 Blofeld (released December 2007), an affordable desktop module combining the sound engines of the Q and the Microwave. Blofeld is still being manufactured today (as of 2022).
 At the start of 2007, Waldorf announces their new line of synths and electric pianos. These include special editions of their famed Q, Q+ and Micro Q line relabled as the Phoenix Edition and the introduction of Blofeld. Also, a design study called Stromberg is shown, but this never went into production.

2009 
 Blofeld Keyboard (released January 2009) - The Blofeld Keyboard is a Blofeld housed in a compact metal case and features a four-octave semi-weighted keyboard and 60MB sample memory in addition to the Blofeld module.
 License SL - Blofeld License SL Sample Upgrade, is a software license that expands the Waldorf Blofeld desktop module with 60 MByte sample memory
 Largo - a software synthesizer that works as a VST and AudioUnit instrument.

2010 
 PPG Wave 3.V (released December 2010) - a software version of the PPG Wave keyboards that works as a VST and AudioUnit instrument.

2011 
 Lector - a software vocoder that works as a VST and AudioUnit plugin.

2012 
 Zarenbourg - an electric piano based on physical modelling and samples

2013 

 Rocket - a paraphonic hybrid synthesizer.
 Nave - a wavetable synthesizer for the iPad.
 Pulse 2 - a paraphonic analog synthesizer.

2014 
 2-Pole - an analog filter.
 Streichfett -  a string synthesizer.

2015 

 nw1 Eurorack Wavetable Oscillator - a digital Wavetable oscillator designed to be used in the Eurorack modular system.

2016 
 kb37 Eurorack - a eurorack based modular synthesis system that contains a 37 key keyboard with a mounting surface for modules up to 107 hp.
 mod1 - a eurorack based analog synthesis module that offers three types of modulation parameters.
 dvca1 - a eurorack based analog dual VCA circuit with input summing and parallel control of separate parameters.
 cmp1  - a eurorack based analog compressor module that offers both RMS and peak modes of operation.

2017 
 vcf1  - a eurorack based analog multimode filter module with distortion.

2018 

 Quantum  - Waldorf's flagship analog/digital hybrid synthesizer.

2019 

 STVC, the keyboard version of the Streichfett with added vocoder and additional tweaking parameters. Released in Summer 2019 in small numbers, followed by a general release in 2020.
Kyra - the world's first fully FPGA-powered synthesizer with 128 voices

2020 
 Iridium - Digital 16-voice Dual Timbral Polyphonic Synthesizer Module with 3 Stereo Digital Oscillators, Dual Filter, 6 LFOs, 6 Envelopes, and Modulation Matrix.

2021 

 M - Hybrid 8-voice Polyphonic Synthesizer Module with 2 Digital Wavetable Oscillators recreating the Microwave sound character, analog SSI Filter, 2 LFOs, 4 Envelopes, Userwavetable Import and SD-Card mass storage.

2022 

 Iridium Keyboard - a variant of Iridium housed in a case with a 49-key Fatar TP/8SK semi-weighted polyphonic aftertouch pressure-providing keyboard. The layout of physical controls is similar to the module version of Iridium, with more space between knobs and buttons, additional dedicated controls for envelopes, LFOs, FX, and layer selection, as well as six Macro buttons.

Distributed products 
 Emes Studio Monitors

Developed for Steinberg 
 SMP 24 (for Atari ST)
 SMP II (for Atari ST)
 Midex+ (for Atari ST)
 Topaz (Harddisk recording, Mr. Wolfgang Palm was involved too)

Notable users of Waldorf gear 
Jean-Michel Jarre
Vangelis
Hans Zimmer
Enya
A-ha
Depeche Mode
The Orb
Nine Inch Nails
Björk
Albert Patron
Stafford Bawler

References

Further reading

External links 

 Homepage of the newly founded Waldorf Music GmbH
 Newly founded Waldorf Music's mailing list
  FAQs for current devices
 Waldorf User FAQs for legacy devices(faq.waldorfian.info)
 Archive containing manuals as PDF files, as well as all public OS versions of their products.
 Stefan Stenzel Interview NAMM Oral History Library (2011)
  Third-party editors for many Waldorf instruments

Synthesizer manufacturing companies of Germany
Musical instrument manufacturing companies of Germany
Companies based in Rhineland-Palatinate